Goa is a 2015 Indian Kannada romantic comedy film directed by Surya. It stars Komal Kumar, Tarun Chandra, Srikanth, Sharmila Mandre, Sonu and British theatre artiste Rachel Wise in lead roles. The film is an official remake of the Tamil film of the same title (2010) directed by Venkat Prabhu. The film features the music composed by Arjun Janya whilst the cinematography is by Rajesh Katta.

Cast
 Komal Kumar as Swamy 
 Tarun Chandra as Ramaraja 
 Srikanth as Surya 
 Sharmila Mandre 
 Sonu 
 Rachel Wise as Rachel
 Ashok
 Ramesh Bhat
 Bullet Prakash
 Shobharaj
 Dharma
Nayantara as the new village girl (cameo appearance - reused  footage from Goa)

Production
Initially titled as Punyathmaru, the director rechristened the film title to be same as that of the original version during the launch of the film. The filming took place at a brisk pace in and around Goa and parts of Karnataka such as Bangalore, Mysore and Srirangapatna.

Soundtrack

Arjun Janya composed the film's background score and music for its soundtrack. The album consists of four tracks, the lyrics for which were penned by Naveen, Hemanth, K. Kalyan and Chandan Shetty.

References

External links
 
 Goa launched

2015 films
Kannada remakes of Tamil films
Indian teen comedy films
Films set in Goa
Indian LGBT-related films
2010s Kannada-language films
2015 romantic comedy films
Films scored by Arjun Janya